Holcocera percnoscia is a moth in the family Blastobasidae. It was described by Edward Meyrick in 1932. It is found in Brazil.

References

percnoscia
Moths described in 1932